The Eurasian water shrew (Neomys fodiens), known in the United Kingdom as the water shrew, is a relatively large shrew, up to  long, with a tail up to three-quarters as long again. It has short, dark fur, often with a few white tufts, a white belly, and a few stiff hairs around the feet and tail. It lives close to fresh water, hunting aquatic prey in the water and nearby.  Its fur traps bubbles of air in the water which greatly aids its buoyancy, but requires it to anchor itself to remain underwater for more than the briefest of dives.

Like many shrews, the water shrew has venomous saliva, making it one of the few venomous mammals, although it is not able to puncture the skin of large animals, nor that of humans. Highly territorial, it lives a solitary life and is found throughout the northern part of Europe and Asia, from Britain to Korea.

Description
The dense short fur on the head, back and sides is greyish-black. The underparts are dirty white and are sharply demarcated from the dorsal surface. Sometimes they are tinged with rusty brown or occasionally are entirely dark grey. There is a white spot just behind the eye and often another near the small, rounded ear which is nearly hidden in the fur. The nose is black and the snout long and tapering. The sharp, mostly white teeth are tipped with red, typical of the shrew subfamily Soricinae. The rusty colour comes from deposits of iron which serve to harden the enamel and which are concentrated in the tips of the teeth, particularly the molars which are the teeth most subject to wear. The female has five pairs of nipples. The legs are short and the hind feet are powerful, with a fringe of short, stiff hairs on the outer edge, both of which features assist while it is driving its body through the water. The tail is slender and has a keel of short white hairs on the underside. This shrew often utters shrill cries as it scurries about.

Its karyotype has 2n = 52 and FN = 98.

Distribution and habitat
The Eurasian water shrew is found throughout Europe with the exception of Iceland, Ireland, certain Mediterranean islands and the Balkans. In Asia, its range extends from western Siberia and Asia Minor to North Korea and the Pacific coast of Siberia. It rarely strays far from water and is found in and around ditches, streams, ponds, watercress beds, fish ponds, damp meadows and rough bushy ground adjoining water.

Biology
Outside the breeding season, both male and female Eurasian water shrews maintain a territory but during the breeding season, only the females do so. At this time the males wander about visiting various female territories which indicates a promiscuous mating system without pair bonding. On the whole they are solitary animals that seem to mutually avoid each other and there is no social hierarchy.

The breeding season extends from April to September and much of the courtship takes place in the water. It either uses pre-existing burrows or digs its own. The nesting chamber is lined with moss, dry grass and leaves. Litters of four to eight or more young are born after a twenty-four-day gestation period. The young are tiny and helpless at birth. Their eyes open at fifteen to eighteen days and they are fully weaned at about seven weeks. Females can produce two or three litters a year. The juveniles disperse after weaning, setting up their own territories. They are sexually mature at six to eight months and their life expectancy is about three years.

The Eurasian water shrew is active both night and day and is thoroughly at home in the water. Its short fur holds air and the skin does not get wet when it swims. When it emerges from the water it enters one of its many burrows and any moisture adhering to the fur is absorbed by the earth walls. It mostly feeds on aquatic organisms which are caught while it is swimming. It can remain underwater for twenty seconds before it has to surface to breathe. Larger prey items can be subdued by the toxic secretions from its submaxillary glands. They feed on crayfish, water snails, small fish, aquatic larvae, insects, spiders, amphibians, especially newts and small rodents are also eaten. It also feeds on land on such things as insect larvae.

The Eurasian water shrew has a pair of glands under its jaw which produce venom, and this has been shown to be potent against the field vole (Microtus agrestis), and lethal at a minimum dose of fifteen milligrams per kilogram body weight. The venom consists of a paralytic peptide which has been patented for use in neuromuscular therapy.
Overall, the Eurasian water shrew venom has stronger paralytic properties and lower cardioinhibitory activity. Thus acting as an immobilizing agent towards their prey or to organisms that may threathen them.

Their behavior in captivity is described in Konrad Lorenz's book King Solomon's Ring.

Status
The International Union for Conservation of Nature lists the Eurasian water shrew as being of "Least concern" in its Red List of Threatened Species. This is because it has a large population distributed across a wide range and its population seems fairly stable. In some areas habitat degradation is occurring and wetlands are being drained but not to such an extent as to increase the status to "Vulnerable". Other possible threats include agricultural products and sewage which may pollute waterways and reduce the availability of food. In western Spain, a separate subspecies (N. f. niethammeri) has a very limited range and may be declining in numbers.

References

Neomys
Mammals of Asia
Mammals of Europe
Mammals of Russia
Mammals of Central Asia
Venomous mammals
Mammals described in 1771
Taxa named by Thomas Pennant